The 1939 Humboldt State Lumberjacks football team represented Humboldt State College during the 1939 college football season. They competed as an independent.

The 1939 Lumberjacks were led by head coach Herbert L. Hart in his second season as head coach at Humboldt State. They played home games at Albee Stadium in Eureka, California. Humboldt State finished with a record of five wins and two losses (5–2). The Lumberjacks outscored their opponents 90–34 for the season, which included three shutouts and only one game where the opponent scored more than 10 points.

Schedule

Notes

References

Humboldt State
Humboldt State Lumberjacks football seasons
Humboldt State Lumberjacks football